Unorganized East Timiskaming District is an unorganized area in the Canadian province of Ontario, comprising the unincorporated portions of the Timiskaming District lying east of the municipal boundaries of Kirkland Lake and north of the municipal boundaries of Gauthier, Larder Lake and McGarry. 

The division does not encompass any named communities, comprising only a small number of residential and recreational properties in the geographic townships of Arnold, Katrine and Ossian. 

The division encompasses 248.84 square kilometres, and had no population in the Canada 2011 Census.

Demographics
Population trend:
 Population in 2011: 0
 Population in 2006: 10
 Population in 2001: 0
 Population in 1996: 0
 Population in 1991: 12

Private dwellings, excluding seasonal cottages: 2 (total: 32)

See also
List of townships in Ontario

References

Geography of Timiskaming District
Timiskaming East